Oleksiy Kazakov (born 22 February 1990) is a Ukrainian professional footballer who plays as a goalkeeper for Polish club Concordia Elbląg.

Career
Kazakov is not a product of any sportive school and only played for amateur teams, before he signed a contract with FC Vorskla in February 2010.

He made his debut in playing for Vorskla Poltava in the Ukrainian Premier League in a match against Kryvbas Kryvyi Rih on 4 March 2012.

On 6 September 2022, after spending three-and-a-half years at Olimpiya Savyntsi, he returned to Poland to join III liga side Concordia Elbląg.

References

External links 

1990 births
Living people
Sportspeople from Mariupol
Association football goalkeepers
Ukrainian footballers
Ukrainian Premier League players
III liga players
FC Vorskla Poltava players
FC Olimpiya Savyntsi players
Ukrainian expatriate footballers
Expatriate footballers in Poland
Ukrainian expatriate sportspeople in Poland
Expatriate footballers in Germany
Ukrainian expatriate sportspeople in Germany
21st-century Ukrainian people